George Kratina (February 13, 1910 – February 28, 1995) was an American sculptor. His work was part of the sculpture event in the art competition at the 1932 Summer Olympics.

References

1910 births
1995 deaths
20th-century American sculptors
20th-century American male artists
American male sculptors
Olympic competitors in art competitions
People from Brooklyn